Festool is a brand of high-end power tools from Germany. Festool Group GmbH & Co. KG is based in Wendlingen and is a subsidiary of the TTS Tooltechnic Systems holding company. It is known for its system-based approach to power tools and its focus on dust extraction.

The company was founded by Gottlieb Stoll and Albert Fezer in 1925 under the name Fezer & Stoll. The company manufactured the world's first portable chainsaw in 1927. The company's name was shortened to Festo in 1933. Festo founded Festo Tooltechnic in 1992, and the power tool division was spun off into an independent company, Festool, in 2000. The company remains privately owned by the family of co-founder Gottlieb Stoll.

As of October 2017, Festool operates subsidiaries in 26 countries including the United Kingdom, the United States, Canada, France, the Netherlands, and Russia. In late 2017, it set up its first Asian subsidiary in South Korea. Festool products are primarily manufactured in Neidlingen (Germany), Illertissen (Germany), and Česká Lípa (Czech Republic). In July 2017, Festool opened its first North American production line at its Lebanon, Indiana, facility, where it produces mainly guide rails for its track-saw system.

Festool's system-based power tool design includes the use of modular plastic containers, called "systainers", that are produced by its sister company TANOS, and multi-function parts such as guide rails for stationary work and power tools.

References

External links

TTS Tooltechnic Systems

Power tool manufacturers
Tool manufacturing companies of Germany
Woodworking hand-held power tools
Manufacturing companies established in 1925
German brands
1925 establishments in Germany